The Tropical Easterly Jet (jet stream) is the meteorological term referring to an upper level easterly wind that starts in late June and continues until early September. This strong flow of air that develops in the upper atmosphere during the Asian monsoon is centred on 15°N, 50-80°E and extends from South-East Asia to Africa.

The term easterly jets was given by Indian researchers P. Koteshwaram and P.R. Krishnan in 1952 Tropical Easterly Jet (TEJ) comes into existence quickly after the Sub Tropical Jet (STJ) has shifted to the north of the Himalayas (Early June).

The formation of TEJ results in reversal of upper air circulation patterns (high pressure switches to low pressure) and leads to the quick onset of the monsoon.

Recent observations have revealed that the intensity and duration of heating of Tibetan Plateau has a direct bearing on the amount of rainfall in India by the monsoons.

When the summer temperature of air over Tibet remains high for a sufficiently long time, it helps in strengthening the easterly jet and results in heavy rainfall in India.

The easterly jet does not come into existence if the snow over the Tibet Plateau does not melt because this weakens the Tibetan heating. This hampers the occurrence of rainfall in India.

Therefore, any year of thick and widespread snow over Tibet will be followed by a year of weak monsoon and less rainfall.

References

Winds